The William Nicholas Straub House is a historic house at 531 Perry Street in Helena, Arkansas.  It is a stylistically eclectic -story structure, built in 1900 for William Nicholas Straub, a prominent local merchant.  The house's main stylistic elements come from the Colonial Revival and the Shingle style, both of which were popular at the time.  The house has a first floor finished in painted brick, and its upper floors are clad in shingles.  The main facade has a single-story porch across its width, supported by three Ionic columns.  The entrance, on the left side, has a single door with a large pane of glass, and is topped by a transom window.  On the right side is a two-sided projecting bay section.  The house's most prominent exterior feature is a crenellated tower which rises above the entry.

The house was listed on the National Register of Historic Places in 1985.

See also
National Register of Historic Places listings in Phillips County, Arkansas

References

Houses on the National Register of Historic Places in Arkansas
Houses completed in 1900
Houses in Phillips County, Arkansas
National Register of Historic Places in Phillips County, Arkansas
Historic district contributing properties in Arkansas